Cairo Roberto da Lima (born 16 September 1976), also known as Cairo Lima, is a Brazilian football manager and former player. Capable of playing both as a defender or midfielder, he had his greatest successes with Atlético Minero, and also played for other Brazilian clubs, such as Paraná, Avaí and Ceará.

After retiring from professional football, he has appointed as an assistant coach to Ricardo Drubscky with Volta Redonda and Atlético Paranaense, and led the team U-23. He later managed Volta Redonda where he managed to unexpectedly reach the semi-finals of the Taça Rio in 2013. After six years he returned to coach Volta Redonda in 2016, in an attempt to repeat his success.

References

External links
  kuniyw.com Profile
  CBF Profile

1976 births
Living people
People from Uberlândia
Brazilian footballers
Brazilian football managers
Brazilian expatriate footballers
Association football midfielders
Expatriate footballers in Romania
Liga I players
Clube Atlético Mineiro players
Paraná Clube players
Avaí FC players
Botafogo Futebol Clube (SP) players
Ceará Sporting Club players
Paulista Futebol Clube players
Clube Atlético Metropolitano players
CS Gaz Metan Mediaș players
Uberlândia Esporte Clube players
Clube Atlético Hermann Aichinger players
Club Athletico Paranaense managers
Volta Redonda Futebol Clube managers
Sportspeople from Minas Gerais